La Cerdanya Aerodrome (Catalan: Aeròdrom de la Cerdanya) is an airfield located in the Catalan town of Alp, in the Cerdanya county. It was founded in 1971 with the establishment of the now-disappeared Aero Club de la Cerdanya.

The Aerdrome grew because of the gliding activity of the Centre de Vol a Vela La Cerdanya, which later became a section of the Aero Club Barcelona-Sabadell.

Integrated into the Catalan Government's new airports plan, the airfield management, which belongs to Aeroports de Catalunya and the Cerdanya County Council, was put up for public tender in 2008, which was won by Gestió Aeronàutica Ceretana, S.L. consortium, composed by Aero Club Barcelona-Sabadell, CAT Helicòpters, Masella, and La Molina.

See also 
Lleida-Alguaire Airport
La Seu d'Urgell Airport

Airports in Catalonia
Cerdanya (comarca)
Airports established in 1971